This is a list of secondary schools and grammar schools in Belfast, Northern Ireland. The type, sector and Department of Education NI reference number is included alongside.

Notes

References

See also
 List of secondary schools in Northern Ireland
 List of grammar schools in Belfast
 List of grammar schools in Northern Ireland
 List of integrated schools in Northern Ireland
 List of primary schools in Northern Ireland

Secondary schools in Belfast
Schools, Secondary
Secondary, Belfast